The Rokua region, also known as the Rokuanvaara region is a region known for its moraine and dunes. The region covers parts of the municipalities of Muhos, Utajärvi and Vaala in the province of Oulu in Finland.

The Rokuanvaara formation was formed at the end of the Wisconsin glaciation period, when fine-grain soil was washed into the region by melting waters. In 1956 the Rokua National Park was established to protect and to preserve the region.

The area is a popular resort among cottagers and sorts people alike. The largest fitness center in Northern Finland, Rokua Fitness Center, is located in the Rokua region. There are also several rental cottages, as well as Hotel Rokuanhovi. The Narrow gauge Rokua railway connects the hotel and the fitness center.

Geopark
Rokua Geopark is a UNESCO global geopark located in north-central Finland. The park lies within the municipalities of Vaala, Muhos and Utajärvi and in between the cities of Oulu and  Kajaani. The bedrock of the Baltic Shield as well as Quaternary landforms are displayed within the park. Amongst the glacial landforms found in the park are:
Drumlins
Eskers
Hummocky moraines
Kettle holes
Terminal moraines
Post-glacial development has left berms, ravines, dunes and peat bogs in the park area.

References

External links
  Rokua
  Photographs from Rokua

Muhos
Utajärvi
Vaala
Geography of North Ostrobothnia